Ivor Warwick (19 March 1934 — 4 June 2017) was a British tennis player of the 1950s and 1960s.

Raised in the Manchester area, Warwick was most successful on the tennis tour in the 1950s, with his title wins that decade including the East of England Championships and North of England Hardcout Championships.

Warwick was a Lancashire county player and earned blues in Cambridge University tennis.

During his regular Wimbledon appearances, Warwick twice made the singles third round, including a loss to top seed Ken Rosewall in 1953. He never missed a men's doubles main draw at Wimbledon between 1952 and 1966. 

Warwick's wife, the former Anthea Gibb, was also a tennis player.

References

External links
 

1934 births
2017 deaths
British male tennis players
English male tennis players
Tennis people from Lancashire
Alumni of the University of Cambridge
20th-century British people